RMS Carpathia was a Cunard Line transatlantic passenger steamship built by Swan Hunter & Wigham Richardson in their shipyard in Wallsend, England.

The Carpathia made her maiden voyage in 1903 from Liverpool to Boston, and continued on this route before being transferred to Mediterranean service in 1904. In April 1912, she became famous for rescuing survivors of the rival White Star Line's  after the latter struck an iceberg and sank with the loss of between 1,490 and 1,635 people in the North Atlantic Ocean. The Carpathia navigated the ice fields to arrive two hours after the Titanic had sunk, and the crew rescued 706 survivors from the ship's lifeboats.

The name of the ship comes from the mountain range of the Carpathians.

Background
Around 1900, the Cunard Line faced tight competition from the British White Star Line and the German lines Norddeutscher Lloyd (North German Lloyd) and Hamburg America Line (HAPAG).

Rather than attempting to fully regain prestige by spending the additional money necessary to order liners that were fast enough to win back the Blue Riband from the German Kaiser Wilhelm der Grosse or large enough to rival the Oceanic in size, Cunard tried to maximize their profitability in order to remain solvent enough to fend off any takeover attempts by the competing shipping conglomerate by the name of International Mercantile Marine Co.

The three new ships were not particularly fast, as they were designed for immigrant travellers, but provided significant cost savings in fuel economy. The three ships became both instruments and models through which Cunard was able to successfully compete with its larger rivals, most notably IMM's lead company, the White Star Line.

The Carpathia was a modified design of the Ivernia-class ships, being approximately  shorter than her "half-sisters." Like her predecessors, her design was based on a long hull, a low, well-balanced superstructure, and four masts fitted with cranes, allowing for effective handling of larger amounts of cargo than was customary on an ocean liner.

History

Design and construction
The RMS Carpathia was constructed by C. S. Swan & Hunter at their shipyard in Wallsend, England for the Cunard Steamship Company, to operate between Liverpool and Boston alongside the Ivernia and Saxonia. Her keel was laid down on 10 September 1901, and she was launched on 6 August 1902, when she was christened by Miss Watson, daughter of the vice-chairman of the Cunard line. She underwent her sea trials on a voyage from the River Tyne to the River Mersey between 22 and 25 April 1903.

When the RMS Carpathia was finally completed, her gross register tonnage had increased to more than 13,500 tons. She was designed with four complete steel decks, a steel orlop deck inholds No. 1 and 2, and a bridge deck 290 ft. long for passengers, the saloon, and cabins, with a boat deck located right above the bridge deck. At the time she was launched, it was said that she was to be fitted for carrying 200 first-class and 600 third-class passengers and large quantities of frozen meat. When she was finally completed, her capacity had increased to about 1,700 passengers.

Despite being an intermediate liner designed mainly for second and third-class travellers, the Carpathias interior accommodations were still quite comfortable and set a standard for the era. The dining saloon was described as decorated in cream and gold, which "combine effectively with the rich upholstery and mahogany of the furniture, and old gold curtains screening the ports", and was capped by a stained-glass dome underneath an electrical fan for ventilation. The second-class accommodation also included a walnut-panelled smoking room located in the aft deckhouse and a handsome library at the forward end of the bridge (A) deck. After the 1905 renovation, these spaces would be converted to first-class accommodations. Third-class accommodations on the Carpathia were extraordinarily generous for the time. The third-class dining saloon extended the full width of the ship and seated 300 passengers, with walls panelled in polished oak and teak dado. Third-class also included a smoking room and ladies' room located immediately forward of the dining saloon on the upper (C) deck, adjacent to the enclosed promenade (or open space) similar to the design on the Ivernia and Saxonia.  Officers were berthed in the forward deckhouse on the bridge (A) deck, above the second-class dining saloon, while the captain's quarters was located on the boat deck immediately below the ship's bridge.

The Carpathias lower decks were well-ventilated by means of deck ventilators, supplemented by electric fans. The ventilation systems were designed to force fresh air over coiled thermotanks, which could be fed with cool water during the summer or steam during the winter, thus heating and cooling the ship as conditions warranted.  Although the ship was fully electrified with over 2,000 lamps, the ship still had backup oil lamps in the cabins when she entered service, in the event that an electrical outage were to occur.

The Carpathia made her maiden voyage on 5 May 1903 from Liverpool, England,  to Boston, Massachusetts in the US, and ran services between New York City and Mediterranean ports, such as Gibraltar, Algiers, Genoa, Naples, Trieste and Fiume.

Early service and renovations
Although lacking the speed and grand luxury of express liners, and having no first-class accommodations until 1905, the Carpathia quickly developed a reputation as a comfortable ship, particularly in rough weather, due to her relatively wide breadth to length ratio, the use of bilge keels, and the lack of vibration typically found in powerful engines. The ship became popular with both tourists and emigrants. During the summer season, the Carpathia operated mainly between Liverpool and New York City, and in the winter, the Carpathia travelled from New York City to the Mediterranean Basin.

After Cunard partnered with the Royal Hungarian Sea Navigation Company "Adria" in 1904, the Carpathia was designated with the duty of transporting Hungarian emigrants. As a result, the Carpathia was renovated in 1905, increasing its capacity from 1,700 passengers to 2,550 passengers. Mainly third-class small cabins were converted to large shared dormitory rooms while adding first-class accommodation to areas that were previously second-class. By 1912, her tonnage has grown to 13,600 and she had a capacity of 2,450 passengers, with 250 being first and second-class passengers, and 2,200 being third-class passengers. She had a crew in 1912 of about 300 members, including 6 officers. She carried 20 lifeboats.

Sinking of the RMS Titanic and the Carpathia rescue of survivors 

The Carpathia departed from New York City on 11 April 1912 bound for Fiume, Austria-Hungary (now Rijeka, Croatia). Among its passengers were the American painters Colin Campbell Cooper and his wife Emma, author Philip Mauro, journalists Lewis Palmer Skidmore and Carlos Fayette Hurd, with their wives Emily Vinton Skidmore and Katherine Cordell Hurd, photographer Dr. Francis H. Blackmarr, and Charles H. Marshall, whose three nieces were travelling onboard the Titanic. Also on board were Hope Brown Chapin, honeymooning youngest daughter of the former Governor of Rhode Island, Russell Brown, Pittsburgh architect Charles M. Hutchison and his wife, Sue Eva Rule, the sister of Judge Virgil Rule of the St. Louis Court of Appeals, as well as Louis Mansfield Ogden with his wife Augusta Davies Ogden, a granddaughter of Alexander H. Rice.

On the night of 14 April, the Carpathias wireless operator, Harold Cottam, had missed previous messages from the Titanic, as he was on the bridge at the time. After his shift ended at midnight, he continued listening to the transmitter before bed, and received messages from Cape Cod, Massachusetts, stating they had private traffic for the Titanic. He thought he would be helpful, and at 12:11 a.m. on the night of 15 April, sent a message to the Titanic, stating that Cape Cod had traffic for them. In reply he received the Titanics distress signal, stating that they had struck an iceberg and were in need of immediate and urgent assistance.

Cottam took the message and coordinates to the bridge, where the officers on watch were initially sceptical about the seriousness of the Titanics distress call. Agitated, Cottam rushed down the ladder to the Captain's cabin and awakened Captain Arthur Henry Rostron, who wanted to scold him, but once he learnt about the seriousness of the message, immediately sprang into action and gave the order to turn the ship around, and then asked Harold Cottam if he was absolutely certain it was a distress signal from the Titanic. Cottam said that he had indeed received a distress signal from the Titanic, which required immediate assistance, and Cottam gave the Titanic position, saying that he was absolutely certain of the seriousness of the message. Whilst dressing, Rostron set a course for the Titanic, and sent for the chief engineer and told him to  "call another watch of stokers and make all possible speed to the Titanic, as she was in trouble."

Rostron ordered the ship's heating and hot water cut off in order to make as much steam as possible available for the engines, and had extra lookouts on watch to spot icebergs. Cottam, meanwhile, messaged the Titanic that the Carpathia was coming as quickly as possible and that they expected to reach their location within four hours. Cottam refrained from sending more signals after this, trying to keep the network clear for the Titanics distress signals. The Carpathia reached the edge of the ice field by 2:45 a.m., and for the next two hours dodged icebergs as small growlers of ice ground along the hull plates. The Carpathia arrived at the distress call's position at 4:00 a.m., approximately an hour and a half after the Titanic went down, claiming 1503 lives. For the next four and a half hours, the ship took on the 706 survivors of the disaster from Titanics lifeboats. Survivors were given blankets and coffee, and then escorted by stewards to the dining rooms.  Others went on deck to survey the ocean for any sign of their loved ones.  Throughout the rescue, the Carpathias own passengers assisted in any way that they could, offering warm food, beverages, blankets, accommodations, and words of comfort.  By 9:00 a.m., the last survivor had been picked up from the lifeboats, and Rostron gave the order to sail away from the area.  was nearby and offered Carpathia supplies but was told to "shut up" by their wireless operators due to Birma not using a Marconi wireless set.

After considering options for where to disembark the passengers, including the Azores (the destination with the least cost to the Cunard Line) and Halifax (the closest port, although along an ice-laden route), Rostron consulted with Bruce Ismay, and ultimately decided to disembark the survivors in New York City, the original destination of the RMS Titanic. News of the disaster rapidly spread on shore, and the humble Carpathia became the centre of intense media attention as she steamed westward towards New York at an average speed of 14 knots. Hundreds of wireless messages were being sent from Cape Race and other shore stations addressed to Captain Rostron from relatives of Titanic passengers and journalists demanding details in exchange for money. On Wednesday, 17 April, the scout cruiser  began escorting the Carpathia to New York. Cottam, by then assisted by the Titanics junior wireless operator Harold Bride, transmitted the names of third-class survivors to the Chester. Slowed by heavy thunderstorms and fog since the early morning of Tuesday 16 April, Carpathia finally arrived in New York on the evening of Thursday 18 April 1912 under heavy rain.

For their rescue work, the crew of the Carpathia were awarded multiple medals by the survivors. Crew members were awarded bronze medals, officers silver, and Captain Rostron a silver cup and a gold medal, presented by Margaret Molly Brown. Rostron was knighted by King George V, and was later a guest of President William Howard Taft at the White House, where he was presented with a Congressional Gold Medal, the highest honour the United States Congress could confer upon an individual.

Josip Car, from Crikvenica, present-day Croatia, was an 18-year-old waiter onboard Carpathia. After participating in the rescue, he kept a Titanic life jacket as a souvenir and donated it in 1938 to the Maritime and History Museum of the Croatian Littoral in Rijeka. It is one of five known and confirmed original life jackets from the Titanic and the only one preserved and permanently displayed in Europe.

Carpathia Seamount, one of the Fogo Seamounts southeast of the Grand Banks of Newfoundland in the North Atlantic Ocean, is named after Carpathia for her involvement in the Titanic disaster.

Service in the First World War
During the First World War, the Carpathia was used to transfer Canadian and American Expeditionary Forces to Europe. At least some of her voyages were in convoy, sailing from New York through Halifax to Liverpool and Glasgow. Among her passengers during the war years was Frank Buckles, who went on to become the last surviving American veteran of the Great War. Apparently some point during her enlistment, her long-faded red funnel, custom of the Cunard Line, was painted in battle grey.

Sinking and aftermath

On 15 July 1918, the Carpathia departed from Liverpool in a convoy bound for Boston, carrying 57 passengers (36 saloon class and 21 steerage) and 166 crew. The convoy travelled on a zig-zag course along with an escort in accordance with procedures against submarine attacks. The escort left the convoy early in the morning of 17 July, and the convoy was cut in half. The Carpathia continued west along with six other ships, and as the largest ship in the convoy, she assumed the role of the commodore ship. Three and a half hours later, at 9:15 a.m., while sailing in the Southwest Approaches, a torpedo was sighted approaching on her port side. The engines were thrown in full-astern and the helm was turned hard-a-starboard, but it was too late to avoid the torpedo. The Carpathia was torpedoed near the No. 3 hatch on the port side by the Imperial German Navy submarine , followed by a second which penetrated the engine room, killing three firemen and two trimmers, and effectively disabling her ability to escape, as the engines were rendered inoperable by the second torpedo impact. The explosion severely damaged the Carpathias electrical gear, including the wireless radio apparatus, as well as two of the ship's lifeboats. As a result, Captain William Prothero, in command of the Carpathia since 1916, signalled the other ships in the convoy to send out wireless messages by use of flags. He then had rockets fired to attract the attention of nearby patrol boats. The remaining convoy steamed away at full speed to elude the submarine.

As the Carpathia began to settle by the head and list to port, Prothero gave the order to abandon ship. All passengers and the surviving crew members boarded the 11 lifeboats as the Carpathia sank. There were 218 survivors of the 223 aboard. As the passengers and crew disembarked, Prothero, the chief officer, first and second officers and the gunners remained on the sinking ship, seeing to it that all the confidential books and documents were thrown overboard. The captain then signalled one of the lifeboats to come alongside, and he and the remaining crew members abandoned their ship. U-55 surfaced and fired a third torpedo into the ship near the gunner's rooms, resulting in a massive explosion that doomed the Carpathia. U-55 started approaching the lifeboats when the  sloop  arrived on the scene and drove away the submarine with gunfire before picking up the survivors from the Carpathia around 1:00 p.m. The Snowdrop arrived back in Liverpool with the survivors on the evening of 18 July.

Discovery and salvage works
Adverse weather conditions forced his ship to abandon the position before Jessop could verify the discovery using underwater cameras. However, when he returned to the location, the wreck was determined to be the Hamburg-America Line's Isis, sunk on 8 November 1936.

It was found that the Carpathia landed upright on the seabed.

The wreck of the Carpathia is owned by Premier Exhibitions Inc., formerly RMS Titanic Inc., which plans to recover objects from the wreck.

Profile

Gallery

See also
 , another vessel that was involved with the Titanic and sank in the First World War
 , another vessel that was initially thought to be the "mystery ship" failing to respond to the Titanics distress calls

References

Further reading
 Butler, Daniel Allen. (2009). The Other Side of the Night: The Carpathia, the Californian, and the Night the Titanic Was Lost. Philadelphia: Casemate.
 Eaton, John P. and Haas, Charles A. (1995). Titanic: Triumph and Tragedy. New York: W. W. Norton & Compan., 2nd ed.

External links
 
 Carpathia on thegreatoceanliners.com(Wayback Machine)
 Biography of Captain Rostron
 RMS Carpathia at sorbie.net
 BBC News video describing a diving exploration of the ship
 RMS Carpathia History on Chris' Cunard Page

 

Ships of the Cunard Line
Steamships of the United Kingdom
Passenger ships of the United Kingdom
RMS Titanic
Ships built on the River Tyne
Ships sunk by German submarines in World War I
World War I shipwrecks in the Atlantic Ocean
1902 ships
Maritime incidents in 1918
Shipwrecks of Ireland
Ships built by Swan Hunter